Ludwigia is a monotypic beetle genus in the family Cerambycidae described by Pic in 1891. Its only species, Ludwigia lixoides, was described by Hippolyte Lucas in 1847.

References

Agapanthiini
Beetles described in 1847